Oregon is an unincorporated community in Mercer County, Kentucky, in the United States.

Oregon was founded as McGary's Station, named after Hugh McGary.

Oregon was considered one of the area's centers of the hog trade by 1846.

References

Unincorporated communities in Mercer County, Kentucky
Unincorporated communities in Kentucky